Jordan Willis may refer to:

 Jordan Willis (ice hockey) (born 1975), retired Canadian ice hockey goaltender
 Jordan Willis (footballer) (born 1994), English footballer
 Jordan Willis (American football) (born 1995), American football player